Italy participated in the Eurovision Song Contest 2017 with the song "Occidentali's Karma", written by Francesco Gabbani, Filippo Gabbani, Luca Chiaravalli and Fabio Ilacqua. The song was performed by Francesco Gabbani. Italian broadcaster Radiotelevisione italiana (RAI) announced in October 2016 that the winning performer(s) of the Big Artists section of the Sanremo Music Festival 2017 would earn the right to represent the nation at the Eurovision Song Contest in Kyiv, Ukraine. The selected performer would also be given the right to choose their own song to compete with at Eurovision. In February 2017, Francesco Gabbani emerged as the winner of Sanremo with the song "Occidentali's Karma". The artist accepted the invitation to represent Italy at Eurovision and decided that "Occidentali's Karma" would be his contest entry.

Background 

Prior to the 2017 contest, Italy had participated in the Eurovision Song Contest forty-two times since its first entry during the inaugural contest in 1956. Since then, Italy has won the contest on two occasions: in 1964 with the song "Non ho l'età" performed by Gigliola Cinquetti and in 1990 with the song "Insieme: 1992" performed by Toto Cutugno. Italy has withdrawn from the Eurovision Song Contest a number of times with their most recent absence spanning from 1998 until 2010. Their return in 2011 with the song "Madness of Love", performed by Raphael Gualazzi, placed second—their highest result, to this point, since their victory in 1990. In 2016, Francesca Michielin represented the nation with the song "No Degree of Separation", placing sixteenth with 124 points.

The Italian national broadcaster, Radiotelevisione italiana (RAI), broadcasts the event within Italy and organises the selection process for the nation's entry. RAI confirmed Italy's participation in the 2017 Eurovision Song Contest on 16 September 2016. Between 2011 and 2013, the broadcaster used the Sanremo Music Festival as an artist selection pool where a special committee would select one of the competing artist, independent of the results in the competition, as the Eurovision entrant. The selected entrant was then responsible for selecting the song they would compete with. For 2014, RAI forwent using the Sanremo Music Festival artist lineup and internally selected their entry. Since 2015, the winning artist of the Sanremo Music Festival is rewarded with the opportunity to represent Italy at the Eurovision Song Contest, although in 2016 the winner declined and the broadcaster appointed the runner-up as the Italian entrant.

Before Eurovision

Sanremo 2017

On 20 October 2016, Italian broadcaster RAI confirmed that the performer that would represent Italy at the 2017 Eurovision Song Contest would be selected from the competing artists at the Sanremo Music Festival 2017. According to the rules of Sanremo 2017, the winner of the Campioni or Big Artists category earns the right to represent Italy at the Eurovision Song Contest, but in case the artist is not available or refuses the offer, the organisers of the event reserve the right to choose another participant via their own criteria. The competition took place between 7–11 February 2017 with the winner being selected on the last day of the festival.

Twenty-two artists competed in the Big Artists category of Sanremo 2017. Among the competing artists was former Eurovision Song Contest entrant Al Bano who, in duets with Romina Power, represented Italy in 1976 and 1985. The performers in the "Big Artists" category were:

Final
During the final evening of the Sanremo Music Festival 2017, Francesco Gabbani was selected as the winner with the song "Occidentali's Karma". RAI later confirmed during the closing press conference for the Sanremo Music Festival on 11 February 2017 that Gabbani had accepted to participate at Eurovision. Afterwards, RAI announced through Twitter that Gabbani would perform his Sanremo song "Occidentali's Karma" at the Eurovision Song Contest 2017.

At Eurovision 
The Eurovision Song Contest 2017 took place at the International Exhibition Centre in Kyiv, Ukraine and consisted of two semi-finals on 9 and 11 May and the final on 13 May 2017. According to Eurovision rules, all nations with the exceptions of the host country and the "Big Five" (France, Germany, Italy, Spain and the United Kingdom) are required to qualify from one of two semi-finals in order to compete for the final; the top ten countries from each semi-final progress to the final. As a member of the "Big Five", Italy automatically qualifies to compete in the final. In addition to their participation in the final, Italy is also required to broadcast and vote in the first semi-final. The European Broadcasting Union (EBU) split up the competing countries into six different pots based on voting patterns from previous contests, with countries with favourable voting histories put into the same pot.

Voting

Points awarded to Italy

Points awarded by Italy

Detailed voting results
The following members comprised the Italian jury:
 Antonello Carozza (jury chairperson)musician, singer, art director
 Fabrizio Brocchieriproducer, label manager, tour manager, writer
 Giusy Casciojournalist
 Chiara di Giambattistatelevision author and screenwriter
 Antonio Allegramarketing director

References

External links

 RAI's official Eurovision website

2017
Countries in the Eurovision Song Contest 2017
Eurovision
Eurovision